Lester Leroy Bower Jr. (November 20, 1947 – June 3, 2015) was an American man executed for the 1983 murders of four men in Grayson County, Texas. Bower spent 31 years on death row and received six stays of execution. He was executed at the Texas State Penitentiary, aged 67, becoming the oldest prisoner executed by Texas since 1976, until the execution of 70-year-old Billie Coble in 2019.

Biography 
Lester Leroy Bower Jr. was born on November 20, 1947, in Arlington, Texas. A college-educated chemical salesman, prior to his conviction, Bower had no criminal record and was married with two children.

Crime 
On October 8, 1983, the bodies of four men, Bob Tate, Jerry Brown, Philip Good and Ronald Mayes, were discovered in a Texas airplane hangar, all were shot in the head at close range. Mayes was a former police officer and Good was a sheriff's deputy. Bower was later arrested after pieces of the victim's aircraft were found at his home.

Trial 
At Bower's trial, prosecutors argued that he had killed Tate in order to steal an aircraft he had previously agreed to buy, he then killed the other three men when they unexpectedly showed up at the hangar. Investigators found parts of the plane in his home, as well as ammunition similar to what was used in the killings. The prosecution argued that the ammunition provided a vital link, as its type was very rare.

Bower initially lied to the investigators, asserting that he had never been to the hangar where the murders took place. He later acknowledged being there, but maintained his innocence, arguing that the men were alive when he left with the disassembled plane he had purchased, although he was not able to produce a receipt for the transaction.

On April 28, 1984, Bower was found guilty of four counts of capital murder and was sentenced to death.

Subsequent investigations 
After Bower's conviction, his lawyers argued the prosecution had withheld information relating to a police tip that the killings may have been connected to drug trafficking, noting the high level of drug activity in the area and Tate's history of selling cocaine. Further questions concerning Bower's innocence were raised in 1989, when a woman called one of Bower's attorney's, explaining that the killings were the result of a drug deal gone wrong, and that her ex-boyfriend and three of his friends were responsible.

Numerous appeals have been brought since Bower's conviction, questioning how Bower was sentenced to death, despite there being no physical evidence pinning him to the crime scene, such as fingerprints, and no witnesses.

Execution 
Bower was executed by lethal injection in the Huntsville Unit and pronounced dead at 6:36 p.m on June 3, 2015, hours after the United States Supreme Court rejected a last-ditch appeal from Bower's lawyer. Justice Stephen Breyer, as well as Justices Ruth Bader Ginsburg and Sonia Sotomayor dissented from the majority.

In his final statement, Bower thanked his family and friends for their support, as well as his attorneys, saying "I have fought the good fight, I held my faith. I am not going to say goodbye, I will simply say, until we meet again. I love you very, very much."

See also 
 List of people executed in Texas, 2010–2019
 List of people executed in the United States in 2015

References 

1947 births
2015 deaths
1983 murders in the United States
American mass murderers
American people executed for murder
Executed mass murderers
21st-century executions by Texas
People executed by Texas by lethal injection
People convicted of murder by Texas
People from Arlington, Texas
Executed people from Texas